Diapolo is a Hungarian clothing company specializing in swimwear for water polo, swimming and recreation for men and women. The name is a combination of the words diablo (meaning devil in Spanish) and polo (as in water polo). Their "dp" logo also feature a pair of devil horns and a pitchfork.

History
Diapolo is established by Hungarian businessman dr. Zoltán Megyesi. The company was founded in 1997.

Water polo sponsorships
Teams using Diapolo equipment are;

National teams
 France men's and women's team
 Georgia men's and women's team
 Greece men's team

 Costa Rica men's team  - from 2021

 Hungarian Water Polo Federation (Hungary men's and women's team) - from 2013
 Slovakia men's team

Club teams

 Jug Dubrovnik
 FREM
 ASV Aachen (swimming)
 Poseidon Hamburg (swimming)
 Laatzen (swimming)
 LSN (swimming)
 Leimen-Mannheim
 OSC Potsdam
 Waspo Hannover
 White Sharks Hannover
 AVUS Szombathely
 Debreceni VSE
 BVSC-Zugló
 Ferencváros - from 2018/19
 Bp. Honvéd
 KSI
 Miskolci VLC
 OSC Újbuda
 Pécsi VSK
 Szegedi VE
 UVSE
 Vasas
 Colorado

See also
 List of swimwear brands

References

External links
  
 Diapolo website 

Hungarian brands
Sportswear brands
Clothing companies of Hungary